Mirja Kyllikki Hietamies-Eteläpää (7 January 1931 – 14 March 2013) was a cross-country skier from Finland who competed at the 1952 and 1956 Winter Olympics. She won a gold medal in the 3 × 5 km relay in 1956 and a silver medal in the individual 10 km race in 1952, placing sixth in 1956. She also won two medals at the 1954 FIS Nordic World Ski Championships with a silver in the 3 × 5 km relay and a bronze in the 10 km.

Hietamies placed second over 10 km at Holmenkollen in 1951. Later she won this event at the Finnish championships in 1953 and 1956 and at the Lahti Ski Games in 1954 and 1955. In 1955 she was selected as Finland's female athlete of the year.

Hietamies retired after the 1956 Olympics and the same year married Olli Eteläpää. She later worked as a skiing coach and physical education teacher, and was a board member of the Finnish Skiing Federation from 1965 to 1967.

Cross-country skiing results
All results are sourced from the International Ski Federation (FIS).

Olympic Games
 2 medals – (1 gold, 1 silver)

World Championships
 2 medals – (1 silver, 1 bronze)

References

External links

 
 
 

1931 births
2013 deaths
People from Lemi
Finnish female cross-country skiers
Olympic cross-country skiers of Finland
Cross-country skiers at the 1952 Winter Olympics
Cross-country skiers at the 1956 Winter Olympics
Olympic gold medalists for Finland
Olympic silver medalists for Finland
Olympic medalists in cross-country skiing
FIS Nordic World Ski Championships medalists in cross-country skiing
Medalists at the 1952 Winter Olympics
Medalists at the 1956 Winter Olympics
Sportspeople from South Karelia